Chandelle Estates Airport  is a public use airport located three nautical miles (6 km) northeast of the central business district of Dover, in Kent County, Delaware, United States. It is privately owned by RJR Airdrome, Inc.

Facilities and aircraft 
It has one asphalt paved runway designated 4/22 which measures 2,533 by 28 feet (772 x 9 m). For the 12-month period ending August 23, 2007, the airport had 6,800 general aviation aircraft operations, an average of 18 per day.

References

External links 
  at Delaware DOT website
 

Residential airparks
Buildings and structures in Dover, Delaware
Airports in Kent County, Delaware